This is a list of designated third country nationals that require advance authorization to access US military bases in Japan. It should be considered by prospective attendees of the various friendship festivals held at US bases around Japan.

List as of 2011
 Afghanistan 
 Algeria
 Bahrain
 Bangladesh
 Belarus
 Bosnia and Herzegovina
 Burma (Myanmar)
 China 
 Cuba
 Djibouti
 Egypt
 Georgia
 Hong Kong
 India
 Indonesia
 Iran
 Iraq
 Israel
 Jordan
 Kazakhstan
 Kuwait
 Kyrgyzstan
 Laos
 Lebanon
 Libya
 Macau
 Malaysia
 Nigeria
 North Korea
 Pakistan
 Palestinian Authority
 Qatar
 Russian Federation
 Rwanda
 Saudi Arabia
 Singapore
 Somalia
 South Africa
 Sudan
 Syria
 Taiwan 
 Tajikistan
 Tunisia
 Ukraine
 United Arab Emirates
 Uzbekistan
 Venezuela
 Vietnam
 Yemen

Inclusion of France
While most countries on the list are those with a history of instability or tension with the US, the inclusion of France in 2009 did attract some media attention in Japan when a French citizen was blocked from visiting a "Friendship Day" at Negishi Heights in Yokohama in 2010. As of 2011 France had been removed from the list.

Differences between 2009 and 2011 lists
In the 2009 list Albania, Armenia, Azerbaijan, Bolivia, Colombia, Croatia, France, Macedonia, Mali, Morocco, Nicaragua, Oman, Peru, Serbia and Montenegro, Turkmenistan and Vietnam were included. In the 2011 list they were removed.

In the 2011 list Rwanda and South Africa were added.

References

Designated Third Country Nationals